Marie Johnson may refer to:

 Marie Odee Johnson (1897–2004), American who was one of the last surviving women veterans from the First World War
 Marie Johnson (suffragist) (1874–1974), Irish trade unionist, suffragist and teacher

See also 
 Mary Johnson (disambiguation)